The Azerbaijan Women's Volleyball Super League, is the highest professional women's volleyball league in Azerbaijan. It is run by the Azerbaijan Volleyball Federation. It is considered to be among the top national leagues in European volleyball, as its clubs have made significant success in European competitions.

Clubs of the Super League (2022-23 season)

List of women's champions

*Following the decision of the 2012–13 Azerbaijan Women's Volleyball Super League, Igtisadchi Baku and Azerrail Baku shared the runner-up position; therefore, both teams are ranked at the 2nd place.

Most successful teams

See also
 Azerbaijan Volleyball League
 Azerbaijan Volleyball Federation

References

External links
 Volleyball in Azerbaijan

Volleyball in Azerbaijan
Azerbaijan
2008 establishments in Azerbaijan
Women's volleyball leagues
Women's sports leagues in Azerbaijan